Didon (Dido) is a tragédie lyrique in three acts by the composer Niccolò Piccinni with a French-language libretto by Jean-François Marmontel. The opera is based on the story of Dido and Aeneas from Virgil's Aeneid as well as Metastasio's libretto Didone abbandonata (which Piccinni himself had set in 1770). Didon was first performed at Fontainebleau on 16 October 1783 in the presence of the French sovereigns, Louis XVI and Marie Antoinette. After being remounted at court twice, the opera had its Paris public premiere on 1 December 1783. It proved to be the composer's greatest success and was billed almost every year till 1826, enjoying a total of 250 performances al the Paris Opera. Didon had some influence on Berlioz's opera on the same theme, Les Troyens.

Roles

Synopsis

Dido, Queen of Carthage (Didon), falls in love with the Trojan warrior Aeneas (Énée), who has been shipwrecked on her shore. However, Dido is promised in marriage to the African king Iarbas (Iarbe). War breaks out between Aeneas and Iarbas in which the Trojan is triumphant. But Aeneas is warned by the ghost of his father, Anchises, that he must leave Carthage at once for Italy. The heartbroken Dido commits suicide by throwing herself on a funeral pyre. Her Carthaginian subjects swear eternal revenge on Aeneas' descendants, the Romans.

Recording
Didon Soloists, Orchestra del Teatro Petruzzelli, conducted by Arnold Bosman (Dynamic, 2003)

References
Notes

Sources
 Lajarte, Théodore, Bibliothèque Musicale du Théatre de l'Opéra. Catalogue Historique, Chronologique, Anecdotique, Paris, Librairie des bibliophiles, 1878, Tome I, ad nomen, pp. 337–338
 Court premiere original libretto: Didon, tragédie-lyrique, en trois actes, représentée à Fontainebleau devant Leurs Majestés, Le 16 Octobre 1783, et pour la première fois, sur le Théâtre de l'Académie Royale de Musique, le Lundi 1er Décembre 1783, Paris, P. de Lormel, 1783

Further reading
 First public performance original libretto: Didon, tragédie-lyrique, en trois actes: représentée pour la première fois sur le Théâtre de l'Opéra, le premier Décembre 1783, Paris, Chez les Marchands de Pièces de Théâtre, 1783
 Piano-vocal score: Piccinni, Didon, Tragédie Lyrique en 3 actes, Paroles de Marmontel, Représentée par l'Académie Royale de Musique le 16 Octobre 1783, Reconstituée et réduite pour Piano et Chant par Gustave Lefevre Directeur de l'Ecole Niedermeyer, Edition conforme au manuscrit et à l'Edition de 1783, Paris, Michaelis, c. 1876–1893
 Blanchetti, Francesco, "Didon", in Gelli, Piero & Poletti, Filippo (eds.),Dizionario dell'Opera 2008, Milano, Baldini Castoldi Dalai, 2007, pp. 316–317.  
 Holden, Amanda (ed.), The New Penguin Opera Guide, New York: Penguin Putnam, 2001. 
 "Didon (1815) – Niccolò Piccinni", University Of North Texas Libraries on library.unt.edu

External links
 

Operas
French-language operas
Operas by Niccolò Piccinni
1783 operas
Tragédies en musique
Operas based on classical mythology
Operas based on the Aeneid
Music based on poems
Cultural depictions of Dido